This was the first edition of the event and was won by Wayne Odesnik.

Seeds

Draw

Finals

Top half

Bottom half

References
 Main Draw
 Qualifying Draw

Visit Panamá Cup de Chitré - Singles
2014 Singles